Jah Heydarbal (also Romanized as Jāh Ḩeydarbāl) is a village in Mardehek Rural District, Jebalbarez-e Jonubi District, Anbarabad County, Kerman Province, Iran. At the 2006 census, its population was 134, in 23 families.

References 

Populated places in Anbarabad County